Anthostomella pullulans is a fungal plant pathogen.

References

External links 

Fungal plant pathogens and diseases
Xylariales
Fungi described in 1928